The Manflas River is a river of the Atacama Region in Chile. It flows from South to North and empties as the Jorquera River and the Pulido River in the Copiapó River.

See also
List of rivers of Chile

References

External links
Región de Atacama

Rivers of Chile
Rivers of Atacama Region